Haligonian may refer to:

 of or from Halifax, Nova Scotia, Canada
 of or from Halifax, West Yorkshire, England
Haligonian, a 1925 schooner built to race Bluenose

See also
 Halifax (name)